Disabled, Not Half a Human Being is an Israeli Non-governmental organization (Voluntary association) which works for the rights of people with disabilities in the State of Israel. Its main goals are raising the general disability pension and equalizing it to the minimum wage, advancing the issue of accessibility, advancing the Right to housing for disabled people, nursing, proper medical treatment and integration of people with disabilities into society and employment.

History 
The organization was established in April 2016, as a part of a national campaign whose name was "Disabled, Not Half a Human Being", which had begun in January 2015, as a protest to the wear of the disability pension in Israel for more than 15 years. The association is a member of several social forums as "The Forum for the Struggle Against Poverty", "The Forum for the health advancement of people with disabilities", and the national committee for advancing the rights of people with disabilities in the Israel Bar Association.

Founders 
The founder and chairman of the association is Alex Fridman, a wheelchair-using man who has a muscular dystrophy which is SMA, a social networking screenwriter.

In January 2015 Fridman decided to establish the association after hearing about a woman with a disability who tried to commit suicide as a result of her economic distress, and began a viral campaign under the slogan "Disabled, Not Half a Human Being" to raise the Disability pension in Israel.

See also 
Disability rights in Israel

References

External links 
  

Disability rights organizations
Organizations based in Israel